Frozen Alive is Obituary's first live DVD. It was recorded August 24, 2006 in Warsaw, Poland. It has songs from each of their albums through Frozen in Time. It also contains an interview conducted a day before the show.

Contents
Concert:
Intro: Rain
Redneck Stomp
On the Floor
Insane
Chopped in Half
Turned Inside Out
Dying
Intro
Internal Bleeding
Back to One
Find the Arise
Back Inside
Threatening Skies
By the Light
Intro
Kill for Me
Solid State
Stand Alone
Back from the Dead
Lockjaw
Slow Death
'Til Death
Slowly We Rot
The Interview

Credits
John Tardy - vocals
Allen West - lead guitar
Trevor Peres - rhythm guitar
Frank Watkins - bass
Donald Tardy - drums

References

Obituary (band) video albums
2007 live albums
2007 video albums
Live video albums